What was originally called 
(around which Harvard University eventually grew) held its first Commencement in September 1642, when nine degrees were conferred.
Today some 1700 undergraduate degrees, and 5000 advanced degrees from the university's various graduate and professional schools, are conferred each Commencement Day.

Each degree candidate attends three ceremonies: the Morning Exercises, at which degrees are conferred verbally en masse; a smaller midday ceremony (at the candidate's professional or graduate school, or undergraduate House) at which diplomas are given in hand; and, in the afternoon, the annual meeting of the Harvard Alumni Association, at which Harvard's President and the day's featured speaker deliver their addresses. In 2022, the alumni annual meeting will be held the week after commencement.

Several hundred Harvard honorary degrees (which with few exceptions must be accepted in person) have been awarded since the first was bestowed on Benjamin Franklin in 1753.
In 1935 playwright George Bernard Shaw declined nomination for a Harvard honorary degree, urging instead that Harvard celebrate its three-hundredth anniversary by "burning itself to the ground... as an example to all the other famous old corrupters of youth" such as Yale.

The ceremonies shifted from late summer to late June in the nineteenth century,
and are now held at the end of May.
A number of unusual traditions have attached to them over the centuries, including the arrival of certain dignitaries on horseback, occupancy by Harvard's president of the Holyoke Chair (a "bizarre" sixteenth-century contraption prone to tipping over) and the welcoming of newly minted bachelors to "the fellowship of educated men and women."

Daybreak rituals

Most upperclass Houses have preliminary rituals of their own. At Lowell House, for example, a perambulating bagpiper alerts seniors at 6:15am for a 6:30 breakfast in the House dining hall with members of the Senior Common Room, after which all process (along with members of Eliot House, who have been similarly roused) to Memorial Church for a chapel service at 7:45.

Morning Exercises

Morning Exercises are held in the central green of Harvard Yard (known as Tercentenary Theatre); the dais is before the steps of Memorial Church, facing Widener Library.
Some 32,000 people attend the event, including university officials, civic dignitaries, faculty, honorees, alumni, family and guests. Degree candidates wear cap and gown or other academic regalia (see Academic regalia of Harvard University).

Academic Parade

 graduate and professional degrees, followed by alumni and alumnae.
Candidates for undergraduate degrees enter next, traditionally removing headgear as they pass the John Harvard statue en route.
Finally comes the President's Procession, as follows:

Holyoke Chair

dent occupies the Holyoke Chair, an uncomfortable and  Elizabethan turned chair reserved for such ceremonies since at least 1770 (when it was already some two hundred years old).
Called "bizarre... with a complex frame and top-heavy superstructure", its "square framework set on the single rear post makes [it] tip over easily to either side."
A stabilizing "fin" was added at the rear sometime in the 20th century.

"It was just uncomfortable. I don’t know how to describe it," recalled Derek Bok, Harvard's 25th president (19711991), whose mother embroidered a "much-needed" cushion for use with it.
Said the Harvard Gazette in 2007:

Ceremonies

At the University Marshal's call ("Mister Sheriff, pray give us order") the Middlesex Sheriff takes to the dais, strikes it thrice with the butt of his staff, and intones, "The meeting will be in order."
Three student speakers (Undergraduate English, Undergraduate Latin, and Graduate English) are introduced and deliver their addresses.

Then, according to the order in which the various graduate and professional schools were created, the dean of each school steps forward to present, en masse, that school's degree candidates.
Each group stands for the President's incantation conferring their degrees, which is followed by a traditional welcome or exhortation:
doctoral graduates, for example, are welcomed "to the ancient and universal company of scholars", while law graduates are reminded to "aid in the shaping and application of those wise restraints that make us free."
Last to be graduated are the Bachelor's candidates, who are then welcomed to "the fellowship of educated men and women."

Honorary degrees are then bestowed.
Finally, all rise to sing "The Harvard Hymn",
expressing the hope (Integri sint curatores, Eruditi professores, Largiantur donatoresprinted
lyrics are supplied)
that the trustees, faculty and benefactors will manifest (respectively) integrity, wisdom, and generosity.
After a benediction is said, the Middlesex Sheriff declares the ceremony closed and the President's Procession  departs.

Once the dais is clear the Harvard Band strikes up and the Memorial Church bell commences to peal, joined by bells throughout Cambridge for most of the following hour.

Mid-day ceremonies

After the Morning Exercises, each graduate or professional school, and each upperclass House, holds a smaller ceremony (with luncheon) at which its member-graduates are called forward by name to receive their diplomas in hand.

Alumni Association meeting and afternoon addresses
At the afternoon meeting of the Harvard Alumni Association, the President and the Commencement Day speaker deliver their addresses.

US Secretary of State (and former Army general) George C. Marshall's 1947 address as Commencement Day Speaker famously outlined a plan (soon known as the Marshall Plan, and for which he would later be awarded the Nobel Peace Prize) for the economic revival of post-World War II Europe.

Historical notes

Sheriffs

"Our fathers... closely associated the thirst for learning and that for beer", a 1924 Harvard history observed,
so that (a modern survey continued) the sheriffs' presence at Commencements "has a practical origin. Feasting, drinking, and merrymaking at earlier commencements often got out of hand. Fights were not unheard of",
and commencements in various years have featured two-headed calves, an elephant, and Indians-versus-scholars archery competitions.
Such goings-on were sufficiently common knowledge that in 1749, Bostonian William Douglass explained to a general readership that the siege and capture of Louisbourg had been "carried on in a tumultuary random Manner, and resembled a Cambridge Commencement."
Thus in 1781, 
Earlier measures had included the 1693 banning of plum cakethe enjoyment of which, officials asserted, was unknown at other universities, "dishonourable to ye Colledge, not gratefull to Wise men, and chargable to [i.e. the fault of] ye Parents".
This was one of many efforts by Increase Mather (Harvard's president from 1692 to 1701) toward "Reformation of those excesses... [of] Commencement day and  so that I might [prevent] disorder and profaneness"for Harvard officials a recurring headache.

Sartorial regulations

To curb unseemly sartorial displays of wealth and social status the 1807 Laws of Harvard College provided that, on Commencement day,

George Bernard Shaw 

Responding to the prospect of being nominated for an honorary degree on the occasion of Harvard's Tercentenary celebration  in 1936, George Bernard Shaw wrote:  A handwritten postscript read: "I appreciate the friendliness of your attitude."

Commencement speakers

See also
 Academic regalia of Harvard University
 History of Harvard University

Notes

References

External links
 Harvard commencement day website

Culture of Harvard University
History of Harvard University